Frederick Hodge may refer to:

 Frederick A. Hodge (1853–1922), American businessman and politician
 Frederick Webb Hodge (1864–1956), editor, anthropologist, archaeologist and historian